The Merkezefendi Cemetery is a burial ground situated in Merkezefendi neighborhood of Zeytinburnu district on the European part of Istanbul, Turkey. The neighborhood and the cemetery are named after Merkez Efendi, an Ottoman Islamic scholar and Sufi (1463–1552).

The cemetery was established in the 16th century with the construction of the tomb of Merkez Efendi at this location.

The cemetery was fully renovated in 2007. At the time of the burial of former Prime Minister Necmettin Erbakan in 2011, a comprehensive maintenance work was carried out at the cemetery.

Currently, burials are allowed only for the members of families with existing graves.

Notable burials 
Listed in order of death year:
Abdullah Cevdet (1869–1932) writer, poet, translator, radical free-thinker and an ideologist of the Young Turks 
Rıza Nur (1879–1942) politician, writer
Adnan Adıvar (1882–1955) physician, politician, writer
Sadettin Kaynak (1895–1961) composer, musician
Halide Edip Adıvar (1884–1964) novelist, feminist politician
Hamdullah Suphi Tanrıöver (1885–1966), poet and politician
Sabahattin Eyüboğlu (1908–1973) translator, essayist, film producer
Samiha Ayverdi (1905–1993) novelist, Sufi
Halil Hâlid (1869–1931) Turkish writer
Mualla Eyüboğlu (1919–2009) architect, restorer
Necmettin Erbakan (1926–2011) engineer, politician, former prime minister
Toktamış Ateş (1944–2013) academician, writer
Neşe Aybey (1930-2015) Miniaturist, Academic

References 

Cemeteries in Istanbul
Sunni cemeteries
Zeytinburnu